Seawoods Grand Central Mall is a part of Nexus Group of malls constructed by Larsen & Toubro and is located in Seawoods, Navi Mumbai. Launched in 2017, the mall has an area of 40 acres and has sectors such as entertainment with a multiplex (Cinépolis IMAX & 4DX); SMAAASH arcade, shop for fashion, accessories, apparel, bags, footwear and cafes and restaurants. It has centralized air conditioning and a security and building management system.

The Grand Central mall is also home to a large exhibition space with a wide selection of home-grown and local brands that exhibit their wares.

References

External links 
 

Shopping malls in Maharashtra
Buildings and structures in Navi Mumbai
Shopping malls established in 2017
2017 establishments in Maharashtra